The Moonbi Range, a mountain range that is part of the Great Dividing Range, is located in the Northern Tablelands of New South Wales, Australia.

These mounds form a spur of the Great Dividing Range where the North West Slopes meet to the Northern Tablelands.

History

Aboriginal history
The original inhabitants of the ranges were Aborigines of the Kamilaroi clan.

European history

To the road traveller on the New England Highway, the Moonbi Range is notable as it is a major uphill climb on the highway as the motorist ascends from Moonbi at the foot of the 1st Moonbi Hill to the Northern Tablelands and the village of Bendemeer.

In 1832 Edward Gostwyck Cory blazed a track over the range that the existing highway has generally followed. A granite boulder named Cory's Pillar (sometimes Cory's Pillow or Cory's Nightcap) commemorates where Cory is believed to have rested during his travels.

In his poem Over the Range, Andrew "Banjo" Paterson wrote of the obstacle that the Moonbi Range created for travelers to the Northern Tablelands. When Banjo Paterson was born in 1864, the Great North Road was still in poor condition making travel to the New England district for wagon teams very difficult.  The mountain range was also immortalised in the annals of Australian country and western music by Buddy Williams.  His song, The Mighty Moonbi Range, fitted into the truckdriving genre and included spellbinding verses such as, "Big Jim was a timber man with muscles made of steel.  An iron nerve to hold the curve, two big hands on the wheel.  But twenty tonnes of ironbark, the devils fatal load, went crashing off the Moonbi... the end of Big Jim's road."

Here teamsters used to hitch several teams together to haul their wagons up this section. Descending the range loaded, they often dragged felled trees behind them to slow their descent down these steep slopes.

Capt. B. H. Martindale, the Commissioner for Internal Communication, in his fourth report in 1860 was able to refer to "2 miles of road at the Moonbi’s Pass which has been greatly improved." By 1865, the road section between Tamworth and Bendemeer had been cleared and fenced.

A second route was found through the Moonbi Ranges in the early 1870s which eliminated the steep section of "The (Blue) Pinch."

In 1937 a new bitumen sealed route to eliminate the earlier "S-Bend" deviation and a steep section was built from Moonbi over the range. Reconstruction on the First Moonbi Hill which began in 1975 now continues on a  section, which has double traffic lanes in each direction. Emergency stopping beds have been built running off the highway on both of the hills in case of vehicle brake failure.

See also

List of mountains in New South Wales

References

Northern Tablelands
Great Dividing Range